Cutlers Green Halt railway station was a station serving the hamlet of Cutlers Green, Essex. It closed in 1952.

References

External links
 Cutlers Green Halt station on navigable 1946 O. S. map
 
 Atmospheric photo of station in 1951

Disused railway stations in Essex
Former Great Eastern Railway stations
Railway stations in Great Britain opened in 1913
Railway stations in Great Britain closed in 1952
1913 establishments in England
Thaxted